Vangueriopsis longiflora is a species of flowering plants in the family Rubiaceae. It is endemic to Tanzania.

Sources 

long
Endemic flora of Tanzania
Vulnerable flora of Africa
Taxonomy articles created by Polbot